The 1951 Minnesota Golden Gophers football team represented the University of Minnesota in the 1951 Big Ten Conference football season. In their first year under head coach Wes Fesler, the Golden Gophers compiled a 2–6–1 record and were outscored by their opponents by a combined total of 258 to 162.
 
No Golden Gophers players were named any major awards, All-American, Academic All-American, All-Big Ten or Academic All-Big Ten. It was the last season that no Golden Gopher players achieved any of the awards.

Halfback Ron Engel was awarded the Team MVP Award.

Total attendance for the season was 255,851, which averaged to 51,170. The season high for attendance was against Nebraska.

Schedule

References

Minnesota
Minnesota Golden Gophers football seasons
Minnesota Golden Gophers football